Jonas Leo Adolf Konto (30 March 1911 – 20 November 1965) was a Finnish sailor who competed in the 1948 Summer Olympics and in the 1952 Summer Olympics.

References

External links
 
 
 

1911 births
1965 deaths
Finnish male sailors (sport)
Olympic sailors of Finland
Olympic bronze medalists for Finland
Olympic medalists in sailing
Sailors at the 1948 Summer Olympics – 6 Metre
Sailors at the 1952 Summer Olympics – 6 Metre
Medalists at the 1952 Summer Olympics